Suani Ben Adem is a settlement in Libya.

References 

Sahara
Baladiyat of Libya